The Cadet Services of Canada was a Corps of the Canadian Army created in 1909. It was superseded by the Cadet Instructors List (CIL), later renamed the Cadet Instructors Cadre. The CS of C was disbanded with the unification of the Canadian Forces on 1 February 1968. 

The CS of C was composed of commissioned militia officers of the former Canadian Army before unification, whose purpose was the training of the Royal Canadian Army Cadets. It not only included officers from the militia, but also officers from the regular forces who were on vacation. 

Canadian Armed Forces personnel branches
Cadet Instructors Cadre (Canada)